A dance studio is a space in which dancers learn or rehearse. The term is typically used to describe a space that has either been built or equipped for the purpose.

Overview 
A dance studio normally includes a smooth floor covering or, if used for tap dancing, by a hardwood floor. The smooth vinyl floor covering, also known as a performance surface and commonly called "marley", is generally not affixed permanently to the underlying floor and can be rolled up and transported to performance venues if needed.

In many cases, the floor is sprung, meaning the construction of the floor provides a degree of flexibility to absorb the impact of intensive dance exercise, such as jumping. This is considered vital to promote good health and safety.

Other common features of a dance studio include a barre, which can be either fixed to the wall or be a standalone move-able device that is approximately waist height and used as a means of support. As music is an integral part of dance, nearly all dance studios have a sound system for playing CD's or music via a Bluetooth enabled device; a remote control is essential for the sound system to make it easy for the instructor to repeat musical passages as needed. A piano is still commonly used to accompany ballet and tap dance, especially in professional studios. In purpose-built dance studios, it is typical for at least one wall to be covered by floor to ceiling mirrors, which are used by dancers to see their body position and alignment. Other essentials in any dance studio are a table for teacher notebooks and other instructional materials, as well as a large wall clock.

In China, the term dance studio is also used to describe a place which is established to teach dance. Commonly referred to as dance schools in Europe, they are often based locally and offer classes to interested students who live nearby. Depending on the studio, a variety of dance styles may be offered, or only one.

References

External links

 
 
Studio
School types